Ottokar of Bohemia may refer to:

 Ottokar I of Bohemia (c. 1155 – 1230), King of Bohemia
 Ottokar II of Bohemia  (c. 1233 – 1278), King of Bohemia